Yi Radicals is a Unicode block containing character elements used for organizing Yi dictionaries in the standard Liangshan Yi script.

List of radicals

Block

History
The following Unicode-related documents record the purpose and process of defining specific characters in the Yi Radicals block:

References 

Unicode blocks